Gank Your Heart is a 2019 Chinese streaming television series starring Wang Yibo and Wang Zixuan. The series is based on the novel Dian Jing Lian Ren by Nanye Lin'er. The drama began airing on Mango TV on June 9, 2019.

Synopsis
A drama that follows the romance between Ji Xiangkong (Wang Yibo), who's a misunderstood professional gamer as he fulfills his dream of winning the championship, and Qiu Ying (Wang Zixuan), who's a live streamer with ambitions to become a professional commentator.

Cast 
Wang Yibo as Ji Xiangkong
Wang Zixuan as Qiu Ying 
Yan Yuhao as Pei Xi
Ding Guansen as Lin Yixuan
Lu Xiaoyu as Lu Yiyi 
Lu Yangyang as Fu Miya
Yan Xujia as Xia Ling 
Cheng Qimeng as Sun Zeyi
Hu Yunhao as Luo Tian
Gao Taiyu as Gu Fang
Wang Ziyun as Shu Wen
Zhang Xiaoqian as Summer
Chai Haowei as Li Gan 
Huang Xinyao as Qiao Xin
Gu Zhaoen as Qi Yue

Award and nominations

Original Soundtrack
Gank Your Heart OST album was released in June 2019 digitally.

References 

Chinese romantic comedy television series
2019 Chinese television series debuts
Esports television series
Television shows based on Chinese novels
2019 Chinese television series endings
Chinese web series
Mango TV original programming